The House of the Arrow is a 1953 British mystery film directed by Michael Anderson and starring Oskar Homolka, Robert Urquhart and Yvonne Furneaux. It is the fourth film version of the 1924 novel The House of the Arrow by A. E. W. Mason, featuring his French detective Inspector Hanaud.

Cast
 Oskar Homolka - Inspector Hanaud
 Robert Urquhart - Jim Frobisher
 Yvonne Furneaux - Betty Harlowe
 Josephine Griffin - Ann Upcott
 Harold Kasket - Boris Wabersky
 Pierre Lefevre - Detective Maurice Thevenet
 Pierre Chaminade - Detective Moreau
 Jacques Cey - Police Commissaire Giradot
 Keith Pyott - Gaston, the butler
 Andrea Lea - Francine, the maid
 Rene Leplay - Hanaud's Clerk
 Anthony Nicholls - Lawyer Jarrett
 Ruth Lodge - Nurse Jeanne Baudin

Critical reception
Allmovie wrote, "one advantage the 1953 version of House of the Arrow has over the first versions is the bluff, hearty presence of Oscar Homolka, who could entertain an audiences by reading the want ads if he so desired" ; and Britmovie noted, "director Michael Anderson handles the thrills pleasantly and the noir suspense is balanced out by Hanaud’s conceited humour with fine results. Austrian actor Oscar Homolka produces a fine portrayal of Mason’s super-smug detective of the French Surete, and the rest of the Anglo-French cast provide sterling support in this well turned-out thriller."

References

External links

1953 films
1950s mystery films
British mystery films
Films shot at Associated British Studios
1950s English-language films
Films directed by Michael Anderson
Films based on British novels
Films based on mystery novels
British black-and-white films
1950s British films